Marc Zamansky (Genève 14 February 1916 - 6 November 1996) was a French mathematician and a member of the French Resistance.

References
Marc Zamansky

1916 births
1996 deaths
20th-century French mathematicians